Siempre Tuya Acapulco (literally Forever Yours Acapulco) (English title A Love To Remember) is a Mexican telenovela produced by Azteca in 2014.Starring Melissa Barrera and Daniel Elbittar as the protagonists of the story, with Cecilia Ponce, Aura Cristina Geithner, Gabriela Roel, Wendy de los Cobos, Ramiro Tomasini and Bernie Paz star as the antagonists.

On 10 February 2014 Siempre Tuya Acapulco debuted on Azteca Trece at 8:30pm, replacing Prohibido Amar. The last episode was broadcast on 17 August 2014, with Las Bravo'' replacing it the following week.

Cast

Remake
Siempre tuya Acapulco was remade as Memori Cinta Suraya in Malaysia by Global Station Sdn Bhd which last episode premieres 23 February 2016.

References

External links
 

2014 telenovelas
2014 Mexican television series debuts
Mexican telenovelas
TV Azteca telenovelas
Spanish-language telenovelas
2014 Mexican television series endings
Television shows set in Acapulco